The 2nd Australian Academy of Cinema and Television Arts International Awards (commonly known as the AACTA International Awards), were presented by the Australian Academy of Cinema and Television Arts (AACTA), a not for profit organisation whose aim is to identify, award, promote and celebrate Australia's greatest achievements in film and television. Awards were handed out for the best films of 2012 regardless of geography, and are the international counterpart to the awards for Australian films (held on 28 and 30 January). The ceremony took place at Soho House in Los Angeles, California on 26 January 2013. The event was hosted by Australian actor Russell Crowe.

The nominees were announced on 8 January 2013, with Silver Linings Playbook receiving the most nominations, with five. Silver Linings Playbook won the most awards with three, and were given to discretionary, non-competitive awards for Best Supporting Actor and Best Supporting Actress to Robert De Niro and Jacki Weaver, respectively.

Winners and nominees
The nominees were determined by up to twelve jurors, which comprise writers, directors, actors and producers and people working in distribution and exhibition. Fifty films were selected to compete as early as May 2012, and by July or August the Jury was assembled to determine the nominees. The announcement was made on 8 January 2013, and Silver Linings Playbook received the most nominations with five, followed by Lincoln and Zero Dark Thirty, with four each. Silver Linings Playbook received the most wins with three, for Best Film, Best Direction and Best Actress. Additionally, two discretionary awards were given to the film for Best Supporting Actor and Best Supporting Actress for Robert De Niro and Jacki Weaver, respectively.

Winners are listed first and highlighted in boldface.

Discretionary awards
Best Supporting Actor: Robert De Niro – Silver Linings Playbook as Patrizio “Pat” Solitano, Jr.
Best Supporting Actress: Jacki Weaver – Silver Linings Playbook as Dolores Solitano

Films with multiple nominations and awards

The following films received multiple nominations.

 5: Silver Linings Playbook
 4: Lincoln and Zero Dark Thirty
 3: Argo
 2: Les Misérables and Life of Pi

The following film received multiple awards.

 3: Silver Linings Playbook

See also
 2nd AACTA Awards
 18th Critics’ Choice Awards
 19th Screen Actors Guild Awards
 66th British Academy Film Awards
 70th Golden Globe Awards
 85th Academy Awards

References

External links
 The Official Australian Academy of Cinema and Television Arts website
 Official Website of the AACTA International Awards broadcast

AACTA International Awards
AACTA International Awards
AACTA International Awards
AACTA Awards ceremonies
AACTA International